Mighty Love is the fourth studio album recorded by American R&B group The Spinners, released in March 1974 on the Atlantic label. It was the Spinners' second album for Atlantic and, like their breakthrough Atlantic debut Spinners, was produced by Thom Bell at Sigma Sound Studios in Philadelphia.

History
The album topped the R&B albums chart, their second consecutive overall to do so. It also reached number 16 on the Billboard 200. The single edit of the title track became the group's fourth R&B chart-topper, while "I'm Coming Home" peaked at number 3—both singles also reached the top 20 on the Billboard Hot 100, as did an edited version of the seven-minute slow jam "Love Don't Love Nobody", which has become a quiet storm radio classic.

Track listing

Personnel
Billy Henderson, Bobby Smith, Philippé Wynne, Henry Fambrough, Pervis Jackson – vocals
Linda Creed, Barbara Ingram, Carla Benson, Evette Benton – backing vocals
MFSB – instrumentation

Charts

Singles

See also
List of number-one R&B albums of 1974 (U.S.)

References

External links
 

1974 albums
The Spinners (American group) albums
Albums arranged by Thom Bell
Albums produced by Thom Bell
Albums recorded at Sigma Sound Studios
Atlantic Records albums